

The Cessna Comet was an early aircraft designed and built by Clyde Cessna in the United States in 1917. It was a conventionally configured wire-braced monoplane with a semi-enclosed cabin that seated one passenger in addition to the pilot. On 5 July 1917, Cessna used it to set a national airspeed record of 124.6 mph (200.5 km/h) and national distance record of 76 miles (122 km) flying from Blackwell, Oklahoma, to Wichita, Kansas.

Specifications

References

External links

 

Comet
1910s United States sport aircraft
Single-engined tractor aircraft
Mid-wing aircraft
Aircraft first flown in 1917